The EB-5 Reform and Integrity Act is bipartisan legislation introduced in 2019 and again in 2021 in Congress that would reform the EB-5 Immigrant Investor federal program, which provides green cards to certain foreign investors. The Senate bill (S. 831) was authored by U.S. Senators Chuck Grassley (R-IA) and Patrick Leahy (D-VT). In the House (H.R. 2901), it was authored by U.S. Rep. Greg Stanton (R-AZ). The legislation was written after several high-profile problems with fraud misappropriation of investor funds put the program's integrity in question. The EB-5 Reform and Integrity Act, if signed into law, would reform the rules and regulations for the approval of green cards to foreign investors and attempt to root out "bad actors" at regional centers, which are public-private organizations that allocate the program's revenues to local public works and investment projects.

Background 
In the U.S., the EB-5 Immigrant Investor Program is a method that foreign nationals can use to obtain a “green card” (permanent legal residency in the United States). The program allows these nationals (and their families) to get a green card in exchange for making an investment into a qualified U.S. domestic investment project. Under government criteria, only certain types of projects can qualify for the program. For example, projects must be done in areas known as “high-unemployment targeted employment areas”, which the U.S. Department of Homeland Security determines.

Regional Centers 
There were over 792 United States Citizenship and Immigration Services (USCIS)-approved EB-5 Regional Centers as of Jan. 15, 2020. “Regional Centers” are entities that exist (under this program) to facilitate investment money and investment projects. USCIS has the authority to give out the “Regional Center” designation to entities.

The Delaware Valley Regional Center (DVRC) is an example of a “Regional Center” under the EB-5 Immigrant Investor Program. The DVRC focuses on infrastructure development rather than commercial real estate projects.

In recent years, the DVRC used EB-5 investor funds to build an interchange at the intersection of the Pennsylvania Turnpike and Interstate I-95. The new interchange eliminated decades-old congestion and reduced car travel time by 20 minutes between New York City and Philadelphia. To make the project happen, the DVRC raised $200 million from EB-5 visa applicants among from several countries. Those applicants’ investments, as a pool, funded the project. And in return, the applicants were granted a permanent legal residence in the United States. One argument on behalf of EB-5 investments is that, in some cases, they can offer better returns for investors. For example, when Regional Centers work with municipalities, such as the DVRC working with local transportation authorities on the Pennsylvania project, the municipalities were able to get a lower interest rate – 2% rather than 3-4% typical interest with regular municipal bonds.

Issues 
The EB-5 Immigrant Visa program has been plagued with management and integrity issues, and the legislation seeks to remedy these issues. Top concerns among Members of Congress are mismanagement, breaches of contract, and fraud and abuse.

Mismanagement 
The congressional intent of the EB-5 program has not always matched its operational reality. A key problem is that the program often invests in projects that fall outside the limited scope of the intention of the program (economic development in mostly-rural high unemployment areas).

Some complaints go even further. Michael Gibson, managing director at USAdvisors.org, has said, “The USCIS is incompetent.” and “They release no information on the capital raised, who is raising it, and where it is going to the public. This leads to misinformation and fraud.” Gibson added that USCIS is “…not able to manage this program and should be replaced with another agency that is capable of providing information on the effectiveness of this program to create U.S. jobs. And when it comes to fraud, it appears that certain RCs are heavily involved.”

Breaches of contract 
Another common problem with the program is that in some cases, after money is invested, the investors do not always get their promised green card. In one example, through the Golden California Regional Center, 90 Chinese citizens invested $555,000 each. They were all promised green cards, which never came.

Fraud and abuse 
In 2021, fraud remains one of the top issues about the EB-5 program. Most regional centers follow regulations and play an important role in the program, but some bad actors remain. In Aril 2021, a Bay Area, California-based regional center was sued for fraud by a group of Chinese nationals. The plaintiffs had paid $550,000 each to the Golden State Regional Center "under the guise of the project being part of the EB-5 Program." The regional center, the plaintiffs claim, misappropriated their money and did not provide any investment returns that were promised.

According to USCIS, common EB-5 fraud schemes may involve anybody, including the petitioner (the immigrant investor) and the applicant, along with anyone or anything associated with the applicant, like the Regional Center principal, the sponsor, the developer of the new commercial enterprise, and the job-creating entity president, owner or manager, among others.

Current regulatory framework 
Like most federal programs, although laws create the parameters of the program, regulations govern how decisions are made and how the program is operated.  

The most current regulations overseeing the EB-5 Immigrant Visa Program were published in their final form on July 24, 2019, under “84 FR 35750 - EB-5 Immigrant Investor Program Modernization.” It was the first major overhaul of the program since its inception in 1993, and the final rule went into effect November 21, 2019.

Fraud and abuse were cited as the main reasons for the new rules. The new 2019 regulations:

 Increased the minimum investment amounts - It raised the minimum investment amount from $1 million to $1.8 million.
 Changed the standards on how projects are even qualified under the “TEA” designation (targeted unemployment areas).
 “Will help ensure that investments are directed to rural and high unemployment areas, rather than to the wealthy, urban centers now benefitting from the program.”
 Moved more projects away from low-unemployment urban areas to rural areas.

History and legislative background 

With the new rules in place, Grassley said the interest groups won't be able to draw the maps to benefit themselves anymore and rural America will finally begin to see the benefits of a nearly 30-year-old program. He has been concerned about the program moving away from its congressional intent, which is: to spur investment and development in economically distressed areas and rural communities. His main concern is that the program has taken investment away from rural America, where it was supposed to be going all along. He has said, “Such big-money interests have drawn maps to define the TEAs to conveniently cover wherever they wanted to build another skyscraper.”

The EB-5 visa class was first created by the Immigration Act of 1990 (IMMACT90). In 1993, Congress created the “Immigrant Investor Pilot Program” to attract applicants to the EB-5 visa program. The pilot program created the program's structure such as the creation of EB-5 Regional Centers.

In January 2019, President Trump extended the program again (that was the most recent).

How it works 
Participation in the program starts when a foreign citizen commits to make an investment into a qualified U.S. development project. To start, foreign citizens petition for a visa through the EB-5 program. Their petition is based on an investment they have made through a DHS-certified “Regional Center” – an investment into new commercial enterprises. EB-5 petitions filed through Regional Center programs are given priority over those that do not invest through Regional Centers.

Legislative details 
As of 2021, there are two versions of the legislation, one introduced in 2019 and the other in 2021.

2019 bill 
In September 24, 2019, Grassley and Leahy introduced a bill (S. 2540, the “EB-5 Reform and Integrity Act”) to address fraud and abuse in the EB-5 Investor Visa Program. The bill was bipartisan and it was only introduced in the Senate, not the House. 

In recent years, the U.S. Department of Homeland Security began to express concerns about the honesty and integrity of the EB-5 program. The purpose of the bill was to address those concerns and to reauthorize the program, with changes, through 2024.

If had passed and been signed into law, the EB-5 Reform and Integrity Act would have:

 Extended the EB-5 Regional Center program through September 2024.
 AllowedDHS more authority to deny applications based on fraud or other offenses.
 Made Regional Centers and investors pay into a fund that DHS would use to investigate fraud and conduct audits.
 Required background checks for Regional Center principals and project principals.
 Gave the applicants (investors) more disclosure information about risks and conflicts of interest.
 Changed how “expected jobs created” is calculated to be more accurate.
 Decreased the processing times for petitions.
 Prohibited foreign ownership of regional centers.

To make these reforms and changes, S. 2540 would have repealed the original authority that created the program in 1993, Section 610 of a 1993 congressional appropriations act. The 2019 bill would have added a new section to the Immigration and Nationality Act (called “E. Regional Center Program,” thereby amending 8 U.S.C. 1153(b)(5).

Although the Trump Administration passed new regulations governing the EB-5 visa program in the summer of 2019, Grassley felt it was still necessary to introduce a bill. He said, “I still have concerns about fraud and abuse in the program that can only be fixed by Congress.”

One of the real changes that the bill was expected to make right away is by better targeting impoverished areas in the U.S. for investment dollars. An internationally recognized scholar on immigration policy, David North of the Center for Immigration Studies, commented that the bill “…makes it harder to put money into prosperous downtown areas.” (The current EB-5 industry opposed the bill.)

2021 bill 
At the start of the 117th Congress in 2021, Grassley and Leahy re-introduced the EB-5 Reform and Integrity Act in the Senate (S. 831), and a companion bill was introduced in the House (H.R. 2901) by U.S. Reps. Greg Stanton and Brian Fitzpatrick (R-PA). The 2021 version of the bill offered some changes and improvements from the 2020 bill, most of which are technical. The bill changes how it handles direct short-term construction jobs, regional center bankruptcies, and revisions to securities law compliance.

Support and opposition 
As of April 1, 2020, the Senate bill had two sponsors: Senators Grassley and Leahy. The House bill had 13 cosponsors.

The National Association of Realtors, which represents real estate brokers, supports the bill.

The Real Estate Roundtable, however, which represents large capital real estate developers, opposes the Grassley bill and instead supports a rival bill sponsored by Senator Mike Rounds.

Alternative legislation 

Alternative legislation was introduced – the Rounds-Graham bill. Senators Rounds (R-SD), Graham (R-SC) and Cornyn (R-TX) introduced the Immigrant Investor Program Relief Act (S. 2778) (“Relief Act”) on November 5, 2019.

The Rounds-Graham bill would include set-asides for rural and targeted unemployment areas but overall would “decrease the monetary incentive to invest in TEAs, which would bring much relief for projects in major cities.” It would also grandfather all petitions filed before the date of enactment of the law.

One EB-5 expert, Suzanne Lazicki, said of the bill: “Grassley wants to see EB-5 used as a catalyst for development in rural and urban distressed areas. The Rounds bill represents the faction that wants to allow EB-5 to continue to flow freely to good projects without undue location prejudice.”

David North of the Center for Immigration Studies described the Rounds-Graham bill as “disastrous” and  “…covered with attractive cake frosting.” He also expressed surprise at Senator Rounds’ willingness to wade into the issue, because of his controversial political history with the subject. “If I were Rounds I wouldn't get within a country mile of any EB-5 matter, but he chose differently,” North said.

See also 

 Immigrant investor programs
 United States Citizenship and Immigration Services
 Pennsylvania Turnpike/Interstate 95 Interchange Project

References

External links 
 About the EB-5 Visa Classification, U.S. Citizenship and Immigration Services
 Immigrant Investor Visas, U.S. Department of State
Section-by-section legislative summary. Invest in the USA.
Legislative details by Congress.gov:
S.2540 - EB–5 Reform and Integrity Act of 2019
S.831 - EB–5 Reform and Integrity Act of 2021
H.R.2901 - To reauthorize the EB-5 Regional Center Program in order to prevent fraud and to promote and reform foreign capital investment and job creation in American communities. 

Proposed legislation of the 116th United States Congress
Proposed legislation of the 117th United States Congress